Hilda Runciman, Viscountess Runciman of Doxford (28 September 1869 – 28 October 1956) was a British Liberal Party politician.

Family and education
A daughter of James Cochran Stevenson, a Liberal Member of Parliament for South Shields, Hilda Stevenson was educated at Notting Hill High School and Girton College, Cambridge, where she took first class honours in the History Tripos. In 1898 she married Walter Runciman, a rising politician. They had two sons and three daughters, including Leslie Runciman, 2nd Viscount Runciman of Doxford, Margaret Fairweather, one of the first eight women pilots in the Air Transport Auxiliary, and historian Steven Runciman.

Political career

Local
She became the first woman member to be elected to the Newcastle on Tyne School Board. She was also a member of the Northumberland County Council Education Committee and one of the earliest women magistrates.

National
In the 1920s Mrs Runciman took on a more national political role. She served as president of the Women's National Liberal Federation, 1919–21, continuing to sit on its executive committee for many years. She also served as president of the Women's Free Church Council, a member of the executive of the League of Nations Union, chaired the Westminster Housing Association, and was a founder of the Westminster Housing Trust. In Liberal Party politics she was a strong advocate of H H Asquith, and under her presidency the Women's National Liberal Federation supported the maintenance of independent Liberalism and an end to the Lloyd George coalition.

Parliament

She became an MP in her own right in 1928, when she was elected in a by-election as Member of Parliament for St Ives in Cornwall, though she remained in Parliament for only one year, handing the seat to her husband at the 1929 general election. This 'halo effect' of women taking a parliamentary seat to then hand it over to their husband accounted for the election of ten women MPs (nearly a third of the women elected to parliament) between the two world wars.

She herself fought the 1929 general election for the Liberals at Tavistock, having been invited to become the candidate by the local Liberal Association against the wishes of national headquarters who were apparently unhappy that she was not a supporter of party leader David Lloyd George. She narrowly failed to gain Tavistock from the Conservatives by just 152 votes.

Titles
In 1937 her husband became Viscount Runciman of Doxford, and she was styled as Viscountess Runciman of Doxford.

Death
Hilda Runciman died of heart failure at her home, 73 Portland Place, London, on 28 October 1956, aged 87.

References

External links 

1869 births
1956 deaths
Female members of the Parliament of the United Kingdom for English constituencies
Liberal Party (UK) MPs for English constituencies
Alumni of Girton College, Cambridge
Members of the Parliament of the United Kingdom for St Ives
UK MPs 1924–1929
British viscountesses
Hilda Runciman, Viscountess Runciman of Doxford
People educated at Notting Hill & Ealing High School
Place of birth missing
20th-century British women politicians
20th-century English women
20th-century English people
Spouses of British politicians